One Town also called the "old town", is located in Visakhapatnam City, India. The area falls under the local administrative limits of Greater Visakhapatnam Municipal Corporation,

History

Vizag's old town area or one town area has more than 300 years of history in British era the business of whole city was located here including the administration of Vizagapatam District. There are many old monuments built here like Town Hall Visakhapatnam (1904), Kurapam Market (1914), European Cemetery (1699), Queen Victoria Pavilion (1904), St John's Church (1844), Queen Mary's school (1800), Ishaq Madina dargah (1706), St Aloysius' Anglo-Indian High School (1847) and the Lighthouse (1903).

About
The Old Town area runs from turner choultry to end of Visakhapatnam Port.  It has many historical educational institutions there are so many middle class students are learning education here. The area is administered by Greater Visakhapatnam Municipal Corporation.

Transport
There are many buses running to every corner of the city from here.

APSRTC routes

References

Neighbourhoods in Visakhapatnam